The Cercado Formation is a geologic group in Dominican Republic. The formation comprises siltstones, limestones, claystones, sandstones and conglomerates deposited in a shallow marine to reef environment. The Cercado Formation, unconformably overlying the Baitoa Formation, preserves bivalve, gastropod, decapod and coral fossils dating back to the Late Miocene to Early Pliocene period.

See also 
 List of fossiliferous stratigraphic units in the Dominican Republic

References

Further reading 
 A. F. Budd and K. G. Johnson. 1999. Origination preceding extinction during late Cenozoic turnover of Caribbean reefs. Paleobiology 25(2):188-200
 M. J. Rathbun. 1920. Additions to West Indian Tertiary Decapod Crustaceans. Proceedings of the United States National Museum 58:381-384
 J. B. Saunders, P. Jung, and B. Biju-Duval. 1986. Neogene Paleontology in the Northern Dominican Republic: 1. Field Surveys, Lithology, Environment, and Age. Bulletins of American Paleontology 89(323):1-79

Geologic formations of the Dominican Republic
Neogene Dominican Republic
Tortonian
Messinian
Zanclean
Siltstone formations
Limestone formations
Shale formations
Sandstone formations
Conglomerate formations
Shallow marine deposits
Reef deposits